The Golden Gate Gales was an American soccer club based in Hayward, California that was a member of the American Soccer League in 1980. In their only season, Mal Roche was top scorer in the league with 17 goals.

After starting the season and playing only six games at Pioneer Stadium on the campus of California State University, Hayward (now California State University, East Bay), the Gales moved and played the majority of their home games at Tak Fudenna Stadium in Fremont, California, on the campus of Washington High School.

Players 

John Spurgeon            G         United States 

Monsour Afshinpour    G        Iran 

Tony Igwe                      D         

Bjorn Dahl                      M       Norway 

Joe Berrico                    D 

Alan Sproates               M        England 

Gerald Hylkema            M        Netherlands 

Johnny Moore               M        Scotland 

Mal Roche                      F         United States 

Alex Basso                     F         United States 

Tony Hauser                  D         United States 

John Anton                    M        United States 

Peter Young                   F          

Lee Cornwell                  M        England 

Tony Gray                       M         

John Brooks                   M

Coach
Lee Atack   Head Coach

 Joseph De Graef
 Osvaldo Garcia

Year-by-year

References

 

Sports teams in Oakland, California
Defunct soccer clubs in California
American Soccer League (1933–1983) teams
Soccer clubs in California
1980 establishments in California
1980 disestablishments in California
Association football clubs established in 1980
Association football clubs disestablished in 1980